Kanda Bongo Man (born Bongo Kanda; 1955) is a Congolese soukous musician.

Kanda Bongo Man was born in Inongo, Democratic Republic of the Congo. He became the singer for Orchestra Belle Mambo in 1973, developing a sound influenced by Tabu Ley. His solo career only started to take off after he moved in 1979 to Paris, where his music started to incorporate elements of then-vibrant zouk music popularized by Kassav (originating in the French West Indies). His first solo albums, Iyole in 1981 and Djessy in 1982, were hits.

He is known for the structural changes he implemented to soukous music. The previous approach was to sing several verses and have one guitar solo at the end of the song. Kanda Bongo Man revolutionized soukous by encouraging guitar solos after every verse and even sometimes at the beginning of the song. His form of soukous gave birth to the kwassa kwassa dance rhythm where the hips move back and forth while the hands move to follow the hips.

Like many African rumba and soukous musicians before him, Kanda Bongo Man also had an entourage of musicians. Many of Kanda's musicians later moved on to start their own solo careers. Most notable of these was Diblo Dibala. Known as "Machine Gun", Diblo Dibala was a vital part of Kanda Bongo Man's lineup on several albums, playing guitar on both Kwasa Kwasa and Amour Fou.

Kanda Bongo Man still tours in Europe and the United States. In July 2005 he performed at the LIVE 8: Africa Calling concert in Cornwall. He has performed several times at the Africa Oyé Festival in Liverpool, most recently in June 2022.

Discography 
 Iyole (1981)
 Djessy (1982)
 Amour Fou (1984)
 Malinga (1986)
 Lela Lela (1987)
 Sai Liza (1988)
 Kwassa Kwassa (1989)
 Isambe Monie (1990)
 Zing Zong (1991)
 Sango (1992)
 Le Rendez-vous des Stades (1993)
 Soukous in Central Park (1993)
 Welcome to South Africa (1995)
 Francophonix (1999)
 Balobi (2002)
 Swalati (2003)
 Non-Stop Feeling (2010)
 Sweet (2010)

Notes

References
The African Music Encyclopedia: Music From Africa and the African Diaspora

External links

Soukous.com Kanda Biography

1955 births
Living people
People from Mai-Ndombe Province
20th-century Democratic Republic of the Congo male singers
Democratic Republic of the Congo songwriters
Soukous musicians
21st-century Democratic Republic of the Congo male singers
21st-century Democratic Republic of the Congo people